Nikoloz "Nika" Kvekveskiri (born 29 May 1992), nicknamed Kvekve, is a Georgian professional footballer who plays as a defensive midfielder for Lech Poznań and the Georgia national team.

Club career
Kvekveskiri started his career in the local club Baia Zugdidi. He made his debut for the first team on 18 August 2009 in a match against FC Locomotive Tbilisi. In 2011, he joined Georgian champion Dinamo Tbilisi. In 2013, he was on loan to Tskhinvali for a half season and in June 2014 he was sold to Dila Gori.

In 2015, he moved to Azerbaijani Inter Baku.

In June 2016, Kvekveskiri moved from Inter Baku to Gabala.

In May 2017, Kvekvesikiri signed a two-year deal with Tobol. On 20 January 2021, Tobol announced that he had left the club.

In January 2021, he moved to Ekstraklasa side Lech Poznań till the end of the 2020–21 season. He signed a two-year extension on 29 April 2021.

International career
Kvekveskiri made his international debut for Georgia on 8 October 2015 in a 4–0 win against Gibraltar for the Euro 2016 qualifiers.

Career statistics

Club

International

Honours
Dinamo Tbilisi
Umaglesi Liga: 2012–13
Georgian Cup: 2012–13

Dila Gori
Umaglesi Liga: 2014–15

Lech Poznań
Ekstraklasa: 2021–22

References

External links

Living people
1992 births
Footballers from Georgia (country)
Association football defenders
Georgia (country) international footballers
Erovnuli Liga players
Azerbaijan Premier League players
Kazakhstan Premier League players
Ekstraklasa players
FC Dinamo Tbilisi players
Shamakhi FK players
FC Dila Gori players
FC Zugdidi players
Gabala FC players
Lech Poznań players
Expatriate footballers from Georgia (country)
Expatriate sportspeople from Georgia (country) in Azerbaijan
Expatriate footballers in Azerbaijan
Expatriate sportspeople from Georgia (country) in Poland
Expatriate footballers in Poland
FC Tobol players
Georgia (country) youth international footballers
Georgia (country) under-21 international footballers